Fischer House may refer to:

in the United States (by state)
Joseph Fischer House, Benicia, California, listed on the National Register of Historic Places (NRHP) in Solano County, California
House at 7227 San Pedro, Jacksonville, Florida, also known as the Fischer House, NRHP-listed
Dr. Luther C. and Lucy Hurt Fischer House, Atlanta, Georgia, listed on the NRHP in DeKalb County, Georgia
Charles M. Fleshman and Emma M. Fischer House, Hawarden, Iowa, NRHP-listed, in Sioux County
Fischer House (Lake Providence, Louisiana), listed on the NRHP in East Carroll Parish, Louisiana
John and Edna Truesdell Fischer Farmstead, Sheldon, Michigan, NRHP-listed
Fischer House (Austin, Texas), NRHP-listed
Fischer-Lasch Farmhouse, Wheeling, West Virginia, listed on the NRHP in Ohio County, West Virginia

See also
Fisher House (disambiguation)